En karl i köket is a 1954 Swedish comedy film directed by Rolf Husberg. The film is based on the Danish play Den mandlige Husassistent by Fleming Lynge and Axel Frische. The play had its premiere at Det Ny Teater in Copenhagen 1937. The story was filmed in 1938 in Denmark as Den mandlige Husassistent and in Sweden as Herr Husassistenten. The film stars Herman Ahlsell, Ittla Frodi, Holger Löwenadler, and Hjördis Petterson.

Cast
Herman Ahlsell as Olle Larsson, head waiter
Ittla Frodi as Karin Stenmark
Holger Löwenadler as Attorney Arvid Stenmark, Karins father
Hjördis Petterson as Bertha Stenmark, Karins mother 
Hugo Björne as Director Axel Möller, hotel owner
Olle Johansson as Bertil Stenmark, Karins younger brother
Kjell Nordenskiöld as Torsten Lindström, Karins fiancé
Sive Norden as Eva Berglund, secretary of attorney Stenmark
Märta Dorff as fröken Eriksson, cashier of attorney Stenmark
Gull Natorp as member of the bridge club
Inga Hodell as member of the bridge club
Mary Rapp as guest at Karins party 
Sven-Axel "Akke" Carlsson as Bertils friend
Sten Mattsson as Bertils friend
Lennart Lundh as Buster, guest at Karins party 
Hanny Schedin as Mrs. Andersson, cleaning woman
Aurore Palmgren as Miss Olsson

References

External links

1954 films
Swedish comedy films
1950s Swedish-language films
Films directed by Rolf Husberg
1954 comedy films
Swedish black-and-white films
1950s Swedish films